"I'm Alive" is a song written by Tommy James and first recorded and released in 1968 by American singer Johnny Thunder.

Thunder's recording of "I'm Alive" was a "raucous" rock single, featuring "Verbal Expressions of T.V." as its B-side. Bob Dylan, who had heard "I'm Alive" on the radio, was asked by Rolling Stones Jann Wenner in 1969 if he was impressed by anything in the rock music scene and pointed to the song: "Never heard it either, huh? Well, I can't believe it. Everyone I've talked to, I've asked them if they've heard that record. It was one of the most powerful records I've ever heard. It's called 'I'm Alive.' By Johnny Thunder. Well, it was that sentiment, truly expressed. That's the most I can say ... if you heard the record, you'd know what I mean."

James recorded and released his version in 1969 with his band the Shondells as part of their album Crimson & Clover. It was released as a B-side for the single "Crystal Blue Persuasion".

Thunders' version was later used by Samsung in their advertisement of the Galaxy S6 Edge in 2015. That version was also used in the soundtrack for the 2018 film American Animals.

Don Fardon version

English singer Don Fardon released a cover as a single also in 1969. His recording has been featured in a UK television advertisement for Five Alive fruit drinks, and a Dutch Vodafone commercial.

On the back of the success of the latter, "I'm Alive" was reissued in the Netherlands and in March 2011 it reached the Top 20 of the Dutch singles chart. Don Fardon's version has been remixed and released as a single by English DJ Ashley Beedle.

Other versions
In 1975, Swedish band Blue Swede recorded a mash-up which combined verses of I'm Alive with others borrowed from Hush, by Deep Purple.  The song was also recorded by Tom Jones. The track appeared on his 2008 album 24 Hours.

Canadian garage-punk band, UIC, from Toronto, Ontario, recorded their version of I'm Alive on their 1986 album Our Garage.

References

1969 songs
Songs written by Tommy James